GreenBytes was an American company providing inline deduplication data storage appliances and cloud-scale IO-Offload systems. Robert Petrocelli founded the company in 2007. On May 15, 2014, it was acquired by Oracle Corporation.

History
The company began as a provider of energy-efficient inline deduplication storage appliances.

In March 2012, GreenBytes released Solidarity, a high availability solid-state drive (SSD) array. Solidarity’s operating system, GO OS, provides real-time deduplication and compression.

In 2012, the company raised $12 million from Generation Investment Management, an investment fund founded by former US Vice President Al Gore, bringing the total amount it had raised by then to $24 million. GreenBytes stated it would use the new funds to expand sales and marketing of its data storage arrays.

In July 2012, GreenBytes acquired the ZEVO ZFS technology for Mac OS X, developed by former Apple engineer Don Brady, who then joined the GreenBytes team. In that same month, Stephen O’Donnell became chairman of the company and Brett Johnson was appointed as senior vice president of global sales.

In August 2012, the company announced a new virtual desktop infrastructure device called IO Offload Engine. The IO Offload Engine captures the I/O intense data stream and processes it in a more effective and efficient manner. This represented a shift for GreenBytes from a focus as a storage array vendor toward input/output–offload solutions for the virtual desktop.

On May 15, 2014, the company was acquired by Oracle Corporation.

References

Software companies based in Rhode Island
Companies based in Providence, Rhode Island
American companies established in 2007
American companies disestablished in 2014
Computer companies established in 2007
Computer companies disestablished in 2014
Software companies established in 2007
Software companies disestablished in 2014
Defunct computer companies of the United States
Oracle acquisitions
Defunct software companies of the United States
2014 mergers and acquisitions